The 23rd House of Representatives of Thailand consisted of 480 members elected in the 23 December 2007 election, and served until its dissolution on 10 May 2011. It saw three prime ministerships: those of Samak Sundaravej (29 January – 8 September 2008), Somchai Wongsawat (8 September – 2 December 2008), and Abhisit Vejjajiva (17 December 2008 – 5 August 2011).

December 2008 prime minister election 
The house's third vote for prime minister was held on 15 December 2008. After the People's Power Party was dissolved by the Constitutional Court on 2 December 2008, Somchai Wongsawat was banned from politics for 5 years. He was then removed along with several other members of the Cabinet. Chaovarat Chanweerakul was appointed acting Prime Minister until House Speaker Chai Chidchob sent a letter inviting members to attend the choosing of a prime minister on 15 December 2008, at 09:30-11:30. Banyat Bantadtan proposed Abhisit Vejjajiva, while  Sanoh Thienthong proposed Pracha Promnok.

Results

By candidate

By party

References 
 อภิสิทธิ์-ประชา" ลุ้นระทึก! ศึกชิงเก้าอี้นายก
 Clip โหวตเลือกนายกฯคนที่ 27
 รายชื่อ ส.ส. ใครเลือกใคร

House of Representatives of Thailand
2008 in Thailand